A home network or home area network (HAN)  is a type of computer network that facilitates communication among devices within the close vicinity of a home. Devices capable of participating in this network, for example, smart devices such as network printers and handheld mobile computers, often gain enhanced emergent capabilities through their ability to interact. These additional capabilities can be used to increase the quality of life inside the home in a variety of ways, such as automation of repetitive tasks, increased personal productivity, enhanced home security, and easier access to entertainment.

Origins
Establishing this kind of network is often necessary for sharing residential Internet access to all networked devices. Based on techniques to mitigate IPv4 address exhaustion, most Internet service providers provide only a single wide area network-facing IP address for each residential customer. Therefore, such networks require network address translation in the network router.

DHCP is used in a typical personal home local area network (LAN) to assign IP addresses within the home subnet. The DHCP server is a router while the clients are hosts (e.g. personal computers, smart phones, printers, etc.). The router receives the configuration information through a modem from an internet service provider, which also operates DHCP servers with this router as one of the clients. The clients request configuration settings using the DHCP protocol such as an IP address, a default route and one or more DNS server addresses. Once the client implements these settings, the host is able to communicate on that internet.

Infrastructure devices

A home network usually relies on one or more of the following equipment to establish physical layer, data link layer, and network layer connectivity among internal devices, also known as the LAN, and external devices outside the LAN networks or the WAN.  The following are examples of typical LAN devices:
 A modem exposes an Ethernet interface to a service provider's native telecommunications infrastructure. In homes these usually come in the form of a DSL modem or cable modem. Quite often these days a modem has an integrated router, and may include a switch and wireless networking.
 A router manages network layer connectivity between a WAN and the HAN. It performs the key function of network address translation enabling multiple devices to share the home's single WAN address. Most home networks feature a particular class of small, passively cooled, table-top device with an integrated wireless access point and 4 port Ethernet switch. These devices aim to make the installation, configuration, and management of a home network as automated, user friendly, and "plug-and-play" as possible.
 A network switch is used to allow devices on the home network to talk to one another via Ethernet. While the needs of most home networks are satisfied with the built-in wireless and/or switching capabilities of their router, some situations require the addition of a separate switch with advanced capabilities. For example:
 A typical home router has 4 to 6 Ethernet LAN ports, so a router's switching capacity could be exceeded.
 A network device might require a non-standard port feature such as power over Ethernet (PoE). (IP cameras and IP phones)
 A wireless access point is required for connecting wireless devices to a network. Most home networks rely on a wireless router, which has a built in wireless access point, to fill this role.
 A home automation controller (smart home hub) enables low-power wireless communications with simple, non-data-intensive devices such as smart light bulbs (Philips Hue) and smart locks (August Home).
 A network bridge connects two networks, often in order to grant a wired-only device, e.g. Xbox, access to a wireless network medium.

Triple play
A service provider's triple play solution features a rented modem/wireless router combination device, such as an Arris SURFboard SBG6580, that only requires the setting of a password to complete the installation and configuration. In most situations, there is no longer a need to acquire additional infrastructure devices or even for the user to possess advanced technical knowledge to successfully distribute internet access throughout the home.

Physical connectivity and protocols

Home networks can use either wired or wireless technologies to connect endpoints. Wireless is the predominant option in homes due to the ease of installation, lack of unsightly cables, and network performance characteristics sufficient for residential activities.

Wireless

Wireless LAN 

One of the most common ways of creating a home network is by using wireless radio signal technology; the 802.11 network as certified by the IEEE. Most wireless-capable residential devices operate at a frequency of 2.4 GHz under 802.11b and 802.11g or 5 GHz under 802.11a. Some home networking devices operate in both radio-band signals and fall within the 802.11n or 802.11ac standards. Wi-Fi is a marketing and compliance certification for IEEE 802.11 technologies. The Wi-Fi Alliance has tested compliant products, and certifies them for interoperability.

Wireless PAN 

Low power, close range communication based on IEEE 802.15 standards has a strong presence in homes. Bluetooth continues to be the technology of choice for most wireless accessories such as keyboards, mice, headsets, and game controllers. These connections are often established in a transient, ad-hoc manner and are not thought of as permanent residents of a home network.

Low-rate wireless PAN 

A "low-rate" version of the original WPAN protocol was used as the basis of Zigbee. Despite originally being conceived as a standard for low power machine-to-machine communication in industrial environments, the technology has been found to be well suited for integration into embedded "Smart Home" offerings that are expected to run on battery for extended periods of time. Zigbee utilizes mesh networking to overcome the distance limitations associated with traditional WPAN in order to establish a single network of addressable devices spread across the entire building. Z-Wave is an additional standard also built on 802.15.4, that was developed specifically with the needs of home automation device makers in mind.

Twisted pair cables 

Most wired network infrastructures found in homes utilize Category 5 or Category 6 twisted pair cabling with RJ45 compatible terminations. This medium provides physical connectivity between the Ethernet interfaces present on a large number of residential IP-aware devices. Depending on the grade of cable and quality of installation, speeds of up to 10 Mbit/s, 100 Mbit/s, 1 Gbit/s, or 10Gbit/s are supported.

Fiber optics 

Newer upscale neighborhoods can feature fiber optic cables running directly into the homes. This enables service providers to offer internet services with much higher bandwidth and/or lower latency characteristics associated with end-to-end optical signaling.

Telephone wires 
 VDSL and VDSL2
 HomePNA support up to 160 Mbit/s

Coaxial cables 
The following standards allow devices to communicate over coaxial cables, which are frequently installed to support multiple television sets throughout homes.
 DOCSIS
 The Multimedia over Coax Alliance (MoCA) standard can achieve up to 270 Mbit/s 
 CWave
 HomePNA support up to 320 Mbit/s

Power lines 

The ITU-T G.hn and IEEE Powerline standard, which provide high-speed (up to 1 Gbit/s) local area networking over existing home wiring, are examples of home networking technology designed specifically for IPTV delivery. Recently, the IEEE passed proposal P1901 which grounded a standard within the Market for wireline products produced and sold by companies that are part of the HomePlug Alliance.  The IEEE is continuously working to push for P1901 to be completely recognized worldwide as the sole standard for all future products that are produced for Home Networking.
 HomePlug and HomePNA are associated standards
 Universal Powerline Association

Endpoint devices and services
Traditionally, data-centric equipment such as computers and media players have been the primary tenants of a home network. However, due to the lowering cost of computing and the ubiquity of smartphone usage, many traditionally non-networked home equipment categories now include new variants capable of control or remote monitoring through an app on a smartphone. Newer startups and established home equipment manufacturers alike have begun to offer these products as part of a "Smart" or "Intelligent" or "Connected Home" portfolio. The control and/or monitoring interfaces for these products can be accessed through proprietary smartphone applications specific to that product line.

General purpose
 Personal computers such as desktops, laptops, netbooks, and tablets
 A network attached storage (NAS) device can be easily accessed via the CIFS or NFS protocols for general storage or for backup purposes.
 A print server can be used to share any directly connected printers with other computers on the network.
 IP phones or smartphones (when connected via Wi-Fi) utilizing VoIP technologies

Entertainment
 Smart speakers
 Television: Some new TVs and DVRs include integrated WiFi connectivity which allows the user to access services such as Netflix and YouTube.
 Home audio: Digital audio players, and stereo systems with network connectivity can allow a user to easily access their music library, often using Bonjour to discover and interface with an instance of iTunes running on a remote PC.
 Gaming: Video game consoles rely on connectivity to the home network to enable a significant portion of their overall features, such as the multiplayer in games, social network integration, ability to purchase or demo new games, and receive software updates. Recent consoles have begun more aggressively pursuing the role of the sole entertainment and media hub of the home.
 DLNA is a common protocol used for interoperability between networked media-centric devices in the home.

Some older entertainment devices may not feature the appropriate network interfaces required for home network connectivity. In some situations, USB dongles and PCI Network Interface Cards are available as accessories that enable this functionality.

Lighting

 "Connected" light bulbs such as Lifx, Philips Hue, Samsung Smart Bulb, GE Link
 Zigbee Light Link is the open standards protocol used by current major "Connected" light bulb vendors

Home security and access control
 Access control: Plume
Security alarms: iSmartAlarm
 Garage door and gate openers: Liftmaster MyQ, GoGogate

Environmental monitoring and conditioning
 HVAC: Nest Learning Thermostat
 Smoke/CO detectors: Nest Protect

Cloud services

The convenience, availability, and reliability of externally managed cloud computing resources continues to become an appealing choice for many home-dwellers without interest or experience in IT. For these individuals, the subscription fees and/or privacy risks associated with such services are often perceived as lower cost than having to configure and maintain similar facilities within a home network. In such situations, local services along with the devices maintaining them are replaced by those in an external data center and made accessible to the home-dweller's computing devices via a WAN connection.

Network management

Embedded devices
Small standalone embedded home network devices typically require remote configuration from a PC on the same network. For example, broadband modems are often configured through a web browser running on a PC in the same network. These devices usually use a minimal Linux distribution with a lightweight HTTP server running in the background to allow the user to conveniently modify system variables from a GUI rendered in their browser. These pages use HTML forms extensively and make attempts to offer styled, visually appealing views that are also descriptive and easy to use.

Apple ecosystem devices

Apple devices aim to make networking as hidden and automatic as possible, utilizing a zero-configuration networking protocol called Bonjour embedded within their otherwise proprietary line of software and hardware products.

Microsoft ecosystem devices
Microsoft offers simple access control features built into their Windows operating system. Homegroup is a feature that allows shared disk access, shared printer access and shared scanner access among all computers and users (typically family members) in a home, in a similar fashion as in a small office workgroup, e.g., by means of distributed peer-to-peer networking (without a central server). Additionally, a home server may be added for increased functionality. The Windows HomeGroup feature was introduced with Microsoft Windows 7 in order to simplify file sharing in residences. All users (typically all family members), except guest accounts, may access any shared library on any computer that is connected to the home group. Passwords are not required from the family members during logon. Instead, secure file sharing is possible by means of a temporary password that is used when adding a computer to the HomeGroup.

Common issues and concerns

Wireless signal loss
The wireless signal strength of the standard residential wireless router may not be powerful enough to cover the entire house or may not be able to get through to all floors of multiple floor residences. In such situations, the installation of one or more wireless repeaters may be necessary.

"Leaky" Wi-Fi
Wi-Fi often extends beyond the boundaries of a home and can create coverage where it is least wanted, offering a channel through which non-residents could compromise a system and retrieve personal data. To prevent this it is usually sufficient to enforce the use of authentication, encryption, or VPN that requires a password for network connectivity.

However new Wi-Fi standards working at 60 GHz, such as 802.11ad, enable confidence that the LAN will not trespass physical barriers, as at such frequencies a simple wall would attenuate the signal considerably.

Electrical grid noise
For home networks relying on powerline communication technology, how to deal with electrical noise injected into the system from standard household appliances remains the largest challenge. Whenever any appliance is turned on or turned off it creates noise that could possibly disrupt data transfer through the wiring. IEEE products that are certified to be HomePlug 1.0 compliant have been engineered to no longer interfere with, or receive interference from other devices plugged into the same home's electrical grid.

Administration
The administration of proliferating devices and software in home networks, and the growing amount of private data, is fast becoming an issue by itself. Keeping overview, applying without delay software updates and security patches, keeping juniors internet use within safe boundaries, structuring of storage and access levels for private files and other data, data backups, detection and cleaning of any infections, operating virtual private networks for easy access to resources in the home network when away, etc.. Such things are all issues that require attention and planned careful work in order to provide a secure, resilient, and stable home network easy to use for all members of the household and their guests.

See also
Access control
Computer security software
Data backup
Encryption
Firewall (computing)
Home automation
Home server
Indoor positioning system (IPS)
Network security
Smart, connected products
Software update
 Virtual assistant

References

External links
Home Area Network for UK Smart Meter
WikiBooks:Transferring Data between Standard Dial-Up Modems
Home Net WG of the IETF

Computer networking
Wi-Fi
Network